Cordiant Communications Group was an advertising agency conglomerate in business from 1995 to 2003. In 2001, Cordiant was the eighth largest advertising group worldwide, with an estimated gross income of US$1.2 billion and billings of around US$13.4 billion.

After the Saatchi brothers were ousted from Saatchi & Saatchi, it was renamed Cordiant. In 1997 Cordiant split into two: Cordiant Communications Group and Saatchi & Saatchi (latter absorbed by Publicis Groupe in 2000). WPP Group purchased and absorbed Cordiant in 2003.

References

Cordiant & Saatchi via ketupa.net

American companies established in 1995
American companies disestablished in 2003
Mass media companies established in 1995
Mass media companies disestablished in 2003
Advertising agencies of the United States
Defunct mass media companies of the United States